12"ers (pronounced 12 Inchers) is a remix album by the English singer-songwriter Phil Collins, the lead vocalist and drummer for the rock band Genesis. The album contains six tracks from his 1985 hit album, No Jacket Required, remixed. All special extended remixes are by John 'Tokes' Potoker, except for "One More Night" remixed by Hugh Padgham. The remixes on this album were originally released on various 12-inch LP singles which were taken from the album No Jacket Required, hence the name.

In Japan and Brazil, the release was originally a four-track EP, released on 12" and cassette. The main difference is the omission of remixes for "Who Said I Would" and "Only You Know and I Know" and the inclusion of an edited remix for "Take Me Home" which clocked in at 6:10. When the album was released on CD in 1988, it was the full six-track album, including the full length remix of "Take Me Home".

Original releases
"Don't Lose My Number", "Take Me Home", "Sussudio" and "One More Night" were all released as 12" singles A-sides. "Only You Know and I Know" was released as the B-side of the "Separate Lives" 12" single. "Who Said I Would" is exclusive to the CD edition of this compilation.

Critical reception
Reviewing retrospectively for AllMusic, critic Shawn M. Haney wrote of the album "The album is a great way to reflect back on one's wondrous memories of '80s life. This will find the listener in the middle of an enjoyable musical experience, especially for those who were and continue to be a part of Collins' fan base."

Track listing

Personnel
 Phil Collins – lead and backing vocals, drums, keyboards
 Daryl Stuermer – guitars
  John 'Tokes' Potoker – drum overdubs, backing vocals

Certifications

References

External links

1987 remix albums
Phil Collins remix albums
Albums produced by Phil Collins
Albums produced by Hugh Padgham
Atlantic Records remix albums
Virgin Records remix albums
Warner Music Group remix albums